The Archivo Nacional de la República de Cuba is the national archive of Cuba. Founded in 1840, it is located in Havana on Calle Compostela.

Collections
As of 1995, the archives includes several distinct collections of records, such as:
 Administracion General Terrestre
 Archivo Calixto Garcia Iniguez
 Archivo Emeterio S. Santovenia
 Archivo Grafico
 Archivo Maximo Gomez
 Archivo Valle Iznaga
 Asuntos Politicos
 Audiencia de La Habana
 Audiencia de Santiago de Cuba
 Audiencia de Santo Domingo
 Banco Nacional de Cuba
 Bienes del Estado
 Comision Militar
 Consejo de Administracion
 Correspondencia de los Capitanes Generales
 Escribanias
 Las Floridas
 Fondo Adquisiciones
 Fondo Donative y Remisiones
 Fondo Especial
 Indendencia General de Hacienda
 Instruccion Publica
 Licencias para Fabricas
 Ordenacion General de Pagos
 Presidios y Carceles
 Real Consulado y Junto de Fomento
 Realengos
 Reales Ordenes y Cedulas
 Secretaria de Agricultura
 Secretaria del Archivo Nacional

See also 
 List of archives in Cuba
 List of national archives

References

Bibliography

Issued by the Archives
 . 1902- . (Some issues fulltext). + Current issues

About the Archives
  
 
  (fulltext)

External links 
 https://web.archive.org/web/20161012043226/http://www.arnac.cu/
 El planero como barrera contra agentes biodeteriorantes de mapas y planos (investigación desarrollada en el Archivo)

Archives in Cuba
Buildings and structures in Havana
1840s establishments in Cuba
Buildings and structures completed in 1944
cuba
20th-century architecture in Cuba
19th-century architecture in Cuba